Mohomaya is a Bengali web series directed by Kamaleswar Mukherjee. The series started streaming on the Bengali OTT platform Hoichoi. The series featuring Swastika Mukherjee, Ananya Chatterjee and Bipul Patra in the lead roles.

Plot
Rishi (Bipul) whose past is deep ocean of secrets revolving around his deceased mother, Maya (Ananya Chatterjee). When he meets Aruna (Swastika Mukherjee), his classmate's mother, Rishi finds the affection he longed for all his life. What initiates as a motherlike bonding soon turns to a compulsive obsession destructing the lives of a perfectly normal family.

Cast 
 Swastika Mukherjee as Aruna
 Ananya Chatterjee as Maya
 Bipul Patra as Rishi
 Sujan Mukherjee as Suranjan
 Master Bihan Saha Dalal in a cameo as Chotto Papan

Production 
With Mohomaya, Kamaleswar Mukherjee made his digital debut. On 3 March hoichoi released the teaser of the series. With the spellbinding soundtrack, instantly draws audience into the story, leaving them with much anticipation.

Overview

Season 1 (2021)
On 26 March 2021, hoichoi released the complete series with five episodes.

Episodes

Season 2 (2021)
On 21 May 2021 hoichoi released the part 2 of the series with brand new five episodes.

Episodes

References

External links

Indian web series
2020 web series debuts
Bengali-language web series
Hoichoi original programming